Bethlehem Castle is a castle in Maastricht, in the south of the Netherlands. It was built in the 12th century. It is one of the oldest castles in the Netherlands. Nowadays it serves as a hotel and as part of the Maastricht Hotel Management School.

References 

Castles in South Limburg (Netherlands)
Rijksmonuments in Maastricht